Seriously Funny Kids is an American comedy series hosted by Heidi Klum that aired from February 1 until April 11, 2011.

Premise
Heidi Klum interviews kids and brings out unpredictable remarks.

Cast
Heidi Klum as host
Mocean Melvin as narrator

Production
On October 12, 2010, Lifetime ordered 20 episodes of Seriously Funny Kids.

Episodes

Reception
The show's first episode was watched by 1.1 million viewers. When the February 15 episode was watched by only 409,000 viewers, the show was moved from 9:30 PM to 11:00 PM. On February 25, Lifetime announced that they were moving the show to Mondays at 6:00 PM.

See also
Kids Say the Darndest Things

References

External links
 
TV Guide

2011 American television series debuts
2011 American television series endings
2010s American comedy television series
English-language television shows
Lifetime (TV network) original programming
Television series about children